The  is an electric multiple unit (EMU) train type operated by Japanese private railway operator Kintetsu Railway since March 1990.

Operations
The trains entered revenue service on 15 March 1990. They are branded "Sakura Liner". A special supplement is required to travel on these services, in addition to the basic fare and limited express charge.

Formation
The two four-car trains are formed as shown below. All cars are powered.

Cars 2 and 4 are fitted with 2 lozenge-type pantographs.

Interior
Car 3 is a deluxe car and features rotating and reclining seats arranged 2+1 transverse with AC outlets built into the armrest and tables which fold out. Cars 2 and 3 come with heated toilets and are equipped with automatic bidets.

Exterior
The trains are painted in a pink and crystal white livery, reminiscent of cherry blossoms. Trains were originally painted in a green and crystal white livery, but it was later changed to invoke the "Sakura Liner" name.

History
The train entered service on 15 March 1990, and have been used for special services. The trains were refurbished in 2010 where they received an updated livery to invoke the "Sakura Liner" name.

References

External links

 Kintetsu Sakura Liner 

Electric multiple units of Japan
26000 series
Train-related introductions in 1990
Kinki Sharyo multiple units
1500 V DC multiple units of Japan